Engelhard Pargätzi (born 31 July 1949 in Arosa, Switzerland) is a retired Swiss alpine skier who competed in the 1976 Winter Olympics.

External links
 sports-reference.com
 

1949 births
Living people
Swiss male alpine skiers
Olympic alpine skiers of Switzerland
Alpine skiers at the 1976 Winter Olympics
People from Plessur District
20th-century Swiss people